The 2019 Reading Borough Council election took place on 2 May 2019 to elect members in 15 wards of Reading Borough Council. There was also a casual vacancy in Thames ward. The Labour Party held control of the council.

The Liberal Democrats and the Green Party succeeded in making significant increases in their vote across the borough, the Liberal Democrats gaining Tilehurst from the Conservatives and the Green Party gaining Redlands Ward from The Labour Party. The only gain for either of the two major parties was in Caversham where Labour gained a seat from the Conservatives. The election was held on the same day as other local elections.

Election result

Composition
After the election the composition of the council was:

Ward results

Abbey

Battle

Caversham

Church

Katesgrove

Kentwood

Minster

Norcot

Park

Peppard

Redlands

Southcote

Thames

Tilehurst

Whitley

References

2019 English local elections
2019
2010s in Berkshire
May 2019 events in the United Kingdom